Thunder Brigade is an action video game developed by Bluemoon Interactive and published by Interactive Magic and Midas Interactive Entertainment for Microsoft Windows in 1998–1999.

Reception

The game received mixed reviews according to the review aggregation website GameRankings.

References

External links
 

1998 video games
Action video games
Video games developed in the United States
Windows games
Windows-only games